The Haiti national under-23 football team represents Haiti in international football competitions and qualifications for the Olympic Games. The selection is limited to players under the age of 23, except three overage players. The team is controlled by the Fédération Haïtienne de Football (FHF).

Competitive record

Olympic Games

Pan American Games

Central American and Caribbean Games

Players

Current squad
The following 20 players were called up for the 2020 CONCACAF Men's Olympic Qualifying Championship.

Honours
Friendly competitions
Copa de Las Antillas
Winners (1): 2002

See also

Haiti national football team
Haiti national under-15 football team
Haiti national under-17 football team
Haiti national under-20 football team

References

u23
Haiti